The 1981 La Flèche Wallonne was the 45th edition of La Flèche Wallonne cycle race and was held on 17 April 1981. The race started in Spa and finished in Mons. The race was won by Daniel Willems of the Capri Sonne team.

General classification

References

1981 in road cycling
1981
1981 in Belgian sport
April 1981 sports events in Europe
1981 Super Prestige Pernod